An ellipsoid is a surface that may be obtained from a sphere by deforming it by means of directional scalings, or more generally, of an affine transformation.

An ellipsoid is a quadric surface;  that is, a surface that may be defined as the zero set of a polynomial of degree two in three variables. Among quadric surfaces, an ellipsoid is characterized by either of the two following properties. Every planar cross section is either an ellipse, or is empty, or is reduced to a single point (this explains the name, meaning "ellipse-like"). It is bounded, which means that it may be enclosed in a sufficiently large sphere.

An ellipsoid has three pairwise perpendicular axes of symmetry which intersect at a center of symmetry, called the center of the ellipsoid. The line segments that are delimited on the axes of symmetry by the ellipsoid are called the principal axes, or simply axes of the ellipsoid. If the three axes have different lengths, the figure is a triaxial ellipsoid (rarely scalene ellipsoid), and the axes are uniquely defined.

If two of the axes have the same length, then the ellipsoid is an ellipsoid of revolution, also called a spheroid. In this case, the ellipsoid is invariant under a rotation around the third axis, and there are thus infinitely many ways of choosing the two perpendicular axes of the same length. If the third axis is shorter, the ellipsoid is an oblate spheroid; if it is longer, it is a prolate spheroid. If the three axes have the same length, the ellipsoid is a sphere.

Standard equation
The general ellipsoid, also known as triaxial ellipsoid, is a quadratic surface which is defined in Cartesian coordinates as:

The points ,  and  lie on the surface. The line segments from the origin to these points are called the principal semi-axes of the ellipsoid, because  are half the length of the principal axes. They correspond to the semi-major axis and semi-minor axis of an ellipse.

When , the ellipsoid is a sphere.

When , the ellipsoid is a spheroid or ellipsoid of revolution.  In particular, if , it is an oblate spheroid; if , it is a prolate spheroid.

Parameterization 
The ellipsoid may be parameterized in several ways, which are simpler to express when the ellipsoid axes coincide with coordinate axes. A common choice is

where

Measuring from the equator rather than a pole,

where

Measuring angles directly to the surface of the ellipsoid, not to the circumscribed sphere,

where

These are true spherical coordinates with the origin at the center of the ellipsoid.

In geodesy, the geodetic latitude is most commonly used, as the angle between the vertical and the equatorial plane, defined for a biaxial ellipsoid. For a more general triaxial ellipsoid, see ellipsoidal latitude.

Volume
The volume bounded by the ellipsoid is 

In terms of the principal diameters  (where ,), the volume is
.
This equation reduces to that of the volume of a sphere when all three elliptic radii are equal, and to that of an oblate or prolate spheroid when two of them are equal.

The volume of an ellipsoid is  the volume of a circumscribed elliptic cylinder, and  the volume of the circumscribed box. The volumes of the inscribed and circumscribed boxes are respectively:

Surface area

The surface area of a general (triaxial) ellipsoid is 

where

The surface area of an ellipsoid of revolution (or spheroid) may be expressed in terms of elementary functions:

or

or

and 

which, as follows from basic trigonometric identities, are equivalent expressions (i.e. the formula for  can be used to calculate the surface area of a prolate ellipsoid and vice versa). In both cases  may again be identified as the eccentricity of the ellipse formed by the cross section through the symmetry axis. (See ellipse). Derivations of these results may be found in standard sources, for example Mathworld.

Approximate formula 
 

Plane sections 

The intersection of a plane and a sphere is a circle (or is reduced to a single point, or is empty). Any ellipsoid is the image of the unit sphere under some affine transformation, and any plane is the image of some other plane under the same transformation. So, because affine transformations map circles to ellipses, the intersection of a plane with an ellipsoid is an ellipse or a single point, or is empty. Obviously, spheroids contain circles. This is also true, but less obvious, for triaxial ellipsoids (see Circular section).

Determining the ellipse of a plane section 

Given: Ellipsoid  and the plane with equation , which have an ellipse in common.

(see ellipse).

Solution: The scaling  transforms the ellipsoid onto the unit sphere  and the given plane onto the plane with equation

Let  be the Hesse normal form of the new plane and

its unit normal vector. Hence

is the  center of the intersection circle and

its radius (see diagram).

Where  (i.e. the plane is horizontal), let

Where , let

In any case, the vectors  are orthogonal, parallel to the intersection plane and have length  (radius of the circle). Hence the intersection circle can be described by the parametric equation

The reverse scaling (see above) transforms the unit sphere back to the ellipsoid and the vectors  are mapped onto vectors , which were wanted for the parametric representation of the intersection ellipse. 

How to find the vertices and semi-axes of the ellipse is described in ellipse.

Example: The diagrams show an ellipsoid with the semi-axes  which is cut by the plane .

Pins-and-string construction 

The pins-and-string construction of an ellipsoid is a transfer of the idea constructing an ellipse using two pins and a string (see diagram).

A pins-and-string construction of an ellipsoid of revolution is given by the pins-and-string construction of the rotated ellipse. 

The construction of points of a triaxial ellipsoid is more complicated. First ideas are due to the Scottish physicist J. C. Maxwell (1868). Main investigations and the extension to quadrics was done by the German mathematician O. Staude in 1882, 1886 and 1898. The description of the pins-and-string construction of ellipsoids and hyperboloids is contained in the book Geometry and the imagination written by D. Hilbert & S. Vossen, too.

Steps of the construction 
 Choose an ellipse  and a hyperbola , which are a pair of focal conics:  with the vertices and foci of the ellipse  and a string (in diagram red) of length .
 Pin one end of the string to vertex  and the other to focus . The string runs through that point of the hyperbola, for which the distance  over any hyperbola point is at a minimum. The analogous statement on the second part of the string and the ellipse has to be true, too.
 Then:  is a point of the ellipsoid with equation  
 The remaining points of the ellipsoid can be constructed by suitable changes of the string at the focal conics.

Semi-axes 
Equations for the semi-axes of the generated ellipsoid can be derived by special choices for point :

Solving for  yields ; furthermore .

Converse 

Confocal ellipsoids 
 

then from the equations of 
 

one finds, that the corresponding focal conics used for the pins-and-string construction have the same semi-axes  as ellipsoid . Therefore (analogously to the foci of an ellipse) one considers the focal conics of a triaxial ellipsoid as the (infinite many) foci and calls them the focal curves of the ellipsoid.

The converse statement is true, too: if one chooses a second string of length  and defines

then the equations

are valid, which means the two ellipsoids are confocal.

Limit case, ellipsoid of revolution 
The ellipsoid is rotationally symmetric around the -axis and
.

Properties of the focal hyperbola 

 True curve
 If one views an ellipsoid from an external point  of its focal hyperbola, than it seems to be a sphere, that is its apparent shape is a circle. If one allows the center  to disappear into infinity, one gets an orthogonal parallel projection with the corresponding asymptote of the focal hyperbola as its direction. The true curve of shape (tangent points) on the ellipsoid is not a circle. The lower part of the diagram shows on the left a parallel projection of an ellipsoid (with semi-axes 60, 40, 30) along an asymptote and on the right a central projection with center  and main point  on the tangent of the hyperbola at point . ( is the foot of the perpendicular from  onto the image plane.) For both projections the apparent shape is a circle. In the parallel case the image of the origin  is the circle's center; in the central case main point  is the center.
 Umbilical points
 The focal hyperbola intersects the ellipsoid at its four umbilical points.

Property of the focal ellipse 
For the limit case one gets

In general position

As a quadric 

An invertible linear transformation applied to a sphere produces an ellipsoid, which can be brought into the above standard form by a suitable rotation, a consequence of the polar decomposition (also, see spectral theorem). If the linear transformation is represented by a symmetric 3 × 3 matrix, then the eigenvectors of the matrix are orthogonal (due to the spectral theorem) and represent the directions of the axes of the ellipsoid; the lengths of the semi-axes are computed from the eigenvalues. The singular value decomposition and polar decomposition are matrix decompositions closely related to these geometric observations.

Parametric representation 

The key to a parametric representation of an ellipsoid in general position is the alternative definition:
 An ellipsoid is an affine image of the unit sphere.

An affine transformation can be represented by a translation with a vector  and a regular 3 × 3 matrix :
 

where  are the column vectors of matrix .

A parametric representation of an ellipsoid in general position can be obtained by the parametric representation of a unit sphere (see above) and an affine transformation:
 .

A surface normal vector at point  is
 

For any ellipsoid there exists an implicit representation . If for simplicity the center of the ellipsoid is the origin, the following equation describes the ellipsoid above:

Applications
The ellipsoidal shape finds many practical applications:

Geodesy
 Earth ellipsoid, a mathematical figure approximating the shape of the Earth.
 Reference ellipsoid, a mathematical figure approximating the shape of planetary bodies in general.

Mechanics
 Poinsot's ellipsoid, a geometrical method for visualizing the torque-free motion of a rotating rigid body.
 Lamé's stress ellipsoid, an alternative to Mohr's circle for the graphical representation of the stress state at a point.
 Manipulability ellipsoid, used to describe a robot's freedom of motion.
 Jacobi ellipsoid, a triaxial ellipsoid formed by a rotating fluid

Crystallography
 Index ellipsoid, a diagram of an ellipsoid that depicts the orientation and relative magnitude of refractive indices in a crystal.
 Thermal ellipsoid, ellipsoids used in crystallography to indicate the magnitudes and directions of the thermal vibration of atoms in crystal structures.

Lighting
 Ellipsoidal reflector floodlight
 Ellipsoidal reflector spotlight

Medicine
 Measurements obtained from MRI imaging of the prostate can be used to determine the volume of the gland using the approximation  (where 0.52 is an approximation for )

Dynamical properties
The mass of an ellipsoid of uniform density  is

The moments of inertia of an ellipsoid of uniform density are

For  these moments of inertia reduce to those for a sphere of uniform density.

Ellipsoids and cuboids rotate stably along their major or minor axes, but not along their median axis. This can be seen experimentally by throwing an eraser with some spin. In addition, moment of inertia considerations mean that rotation along the major axis is more easily perturbed than rotation along the minor axis.

One practical effect of this is that scalene astronomical bodies such as  generally rotate along their minor axes (as does Earth, which is merely oblate); in addition, because of tidal locking, moons in synchronous orbit such as Mimas orbit with their major axis aligned radially to their planet.

A spinning body of homogeneous self-gravitating fluid will assume the form of either a Maclaurin spheroid (oblate spheroid) or Jacobi ellipsoid (scalene ellipsoid) when in hydrostatic equilibrium, and for moderate rates of rotation.  At faster rotations, non-ellipsoidal piriform or oviform shapes can be expected, but these are not stable.

Fluid dynamics
The ellipsoid is the most general shape for which it has been possible to calculate the creeping flow of fluid around the solid shape. The calculations include the force required to translate through a fluid and to rotate within it. Applications include determining the size and shape of large molecules, the sinking rate of small particles, and the swimming abilities of microorganisms.

In probability and statistics
The elliptical distributions, which generalize the multivariate normal distribution and are used in finance, can be defined in terms of their density functions. When they exist, the density functions  have the structure:

Thus the density function is a scalar-to-scalar transformation of a quadric expression. Moreover, the equation for any iso-density surface states that the quadric expression equals some constant specific to that value of the density, and the iso-density surface is an ellipsoid.

In higher dimensions 
A hyperellipsoid, or ellipsoid of dimension  in a Euclidean space of dimension , is a quadric hypersurface defined by a polynomial of degree two that has a homogeneous part of degree two which is a positive definite quadratic form. 

One can also define a hyperellipsoid as the image of a sphere under an invertible affine  transformation. The spectral theorem can again be used to obtain a standard equation of the form 

The volume of an -dimensional hyperellipsoid can be obtained by replacing  by the product of the semi-axes  in the formula for the volume of a hypersphere:

(where  is the gamma function).

See also 
 Ellipsoidal dome
 Ellipsoid method
 Ellipsoidal coordinates
 Elliptical distribution, in statistics
 Flattening, also called ellipticity and oblateness, is a measure of the compression of a circle or sphere along a diameter to form an ellipse or an ellipsoid of revolution (spheroid), respectively.
 Focaloid, a shell bounded by two concentric, confocal ellipsoids
 Geodesics on an ellipsoid
 Geodetic datum, the gravitational Earth modeled by a best-fitted ellipsoid
 Homoeoid, a shell bounded by two concentric similar ellipsoids
 List of surfaces
 Superellipsoid

Notes

References

External links 

 "Ellipsoid" by Jeff Bryant, Wolfram Demonstrations Project, 2007.
 Ellipsoid and Quadratic Surface, MathWorld.

Geometric shapes
Surfaces
Quadrics

ta:நீளுருண்டை